Sicya macularia, known generally as sharp-lined yellow, is a species of geometrid moth in the family Geometridae. Other common names include the pink-bordered yellow and two-pronged looper. It is found in North America.

The MONA or Hodges number for Sicya macularia is 6912.

Subspecies
These three subspecies belong to the species Sicya macularia:
 Sicya macularia cruzensis Dyar
 Sicya macularia laetula Barnes & McDunnough
 Sicya macularia macularia

References

Further reading

External links

 

Ourapterygini
Articles created by Qbugbot
Moths described in 1850